Alberta has provincial legislation allowing its municipalities to conduct municipal censuses between April 1 and June 30 inclusive. Municipalities choose to conduct their own censuses for multiple reasons such as to better inform municipal service planning and provision, to capitalize on per capita based grant funding from higher levels of government, or to simply update their populations since the last federal census.

Alberta began the year of 2019 with 351 municipalities. Of these, at least 18 have published their intentions to conduct a municipal census in 2019. 

Some municipalities achieved population milestones as a result of their 2019 censuses. Lethbridge both exceeded 100,000 residents and surpassed Red Deer as Alberta's third largest city after counting 101,482 residents. Airdrie, now the fifth-largest city in the province after passing Grande Prairie  (which last calculated its population in the 2018 Alberta municipal censuses), grew beyond the 70,000-mark.

Municipal census results 
The following summarizes the results of the numerous municipal censuses conducted in 2019.

Breakdowns

Hamlets 
The following is a list of hamlet populations determined by 2019 municipal censuses conducted by Lac La Biche County and Sturgeon County.

See also 
List of communities in Alberta

Notes

References

External links 
Alberta Municipal Affairs
Alberta Municipal Affairs: Municipal census
Alberta Municipal Affairs: Municipal population lists
Statistics Canada
Statistics Canada: Census Program

Local government in Alberta
Municipal censuses in Alberta
2019 censuses
2019 in Alberta